Glenea fatalis is a species of beetle in the family Cerambycidae. It was described by Francis Polkinghorne Pascoe in 1867. It is known from Malaysia, Borneo and Sumatra.

References

fatalis
Beetles described in 1867